Wyoming is a state in the Mountain West subregion of the Western United States. It is bordered by Montana to the north and northwest, South Dakota and Nebraska to the east, Idaho to the west, Utah to the southwest, and Colorado to the south. With a population of 576,851 in the 2020 United States census, Wyoming is the least populous state despite being the 10th largest by area, with the second-lowest population density after Alaska. The state capital and most populous city is Cheyenne, which had an estimated population of 63,957 in 2018.

Wyoming's western half is covered mostly by the ranges and rangelands of the Rocky Mountains, while the eastern half of the state is high-elevation prairie called the High Plains. It is drier and windier than the rest of the country, being split between semi-arid and continental climates with greater temperature extremes. Almost half of the land in Wyoming is owned by the federal government, generally protected for public uses. The state ranks 6th by area and fifth by proportion of a state's land owned by the federal government. Federal lands include two national parks (Grand Teton and Yellowstone), two national recreation areas, two national monuments, several national forests, historic sites, fish hatcheries, and wildlife refuges.

Indigenous peoples inhabited the region for thousands of years. Historic and current federally recognized tribes include the Arapaho, Crow, Lakota, and Shoshone. During European exploration, the Spanish Empire was the first to "claim" southern Wyoming. With Mexican independence, it became part of that republic. After defeat in the Mexican–American War, Mexico ceded this territory to the U.S. in 1848.

The region was named "Wyoming" in a bill introduced to Congress in 1865 to provide a temporary government for the territory of Wyoming. It had been used earlier by colonists for the Wyoming Valley in Pennsylvania, and is derived from the Lenape language Munsee word , meaning "at the big river flat".

Bills for Wyoming Territory's admission to the union were introduced in both the U.S. Senate and U.S. House of Representatives in December 1889. On March 27, 1890, the House passed the bill and President Benjamin Harrison signed Wyoming's statehood bill; Wyoming became the 44th state in the union.

Historically, European Americans farmed and ranched here, with shepherds and cattle ranchers in conflict over lands. Today Wyoming's economy is largely based on tourism and the extraction of minerals such as coal, natural gas, oil, and trona. Agricultural commodities include barley, hay, livestock, sugar beets, wheat, and wool. It was the first state (barring New Jersey before 1807) to allow women the right to vote and the right to assume elected office, as well as the first state to elect a female governor. Due to this part of its history, its main nickname is "The Equality State" and its official state motto is "Equal Rights". It has been a politically conservative state since the 1950s. The Republican presidential nominee has carried the state in every election since 1968.

History

Several Native American groups originally inhabited the region today known as Wyoming. The Crow, Arapaho, Lakota, and Shoshone were but a few of the original inhabitants European explorers encountered when they first visited the region. What is now southwestern Wyoming was claimed by the Spanish Empire, which extended through the Southwest and Mexico. With Mexican independence in 1821, it was considered part of Alta California. U.S. expansion brought settlers who fought for control. Mexico ceded these territories after its defeat in 1848 in the Mexican–American War.

From the late 18th century, French-Canadian trappers from Québec and Montréal regularly entered the area for trade with the tribes. French toponyms such as Téton and La Ramie are marks of that history.

American John Colter first recorded a description in English of the region in 1807. He was a member of the Lewis and Clark Expedition, which was guided by French Canadian Toussaint Charbonneau and his young Shoshone wife, Sacagawea. At the time, Colter's reports of the Yellowstone area were considered fictional. On a return from Astoria, Robert Stuart and a party of five men discovered South Pass in 1812.

The Oregon Trail later followed that route as emigrants moved to the west coast. In 1850, mountain man Jim Bridger found what is now known as Bridger Pass. Bridger also explored Yellowstone, and filed reports on the region that, like Colter's, were largely regarded at the time as tall tales. The Union Pacific Railroad constructed track through Bridger Pass in 1868. It was used as the route for construction of Interstate 80 through the mountains 90 years later.

The region acquired the name Wyoming by 1865, when Representative James Mitchell Ashley of Ohio introduced a bill to Congress to provide a "temporary government for the territory of Wyoming". The territory was named after the Wyoming Valley in Pennsylvania. Thomas Campbell wrote his 1809 poem "Gertrude of Wyoming", inspired by the Battle of Wyoming in the American Revolutionary War. The name ultimately derives from the Lenape Munsee word  ("at the big river flat").

After the Union Pacific Railroad reached Cheyenne in 1867, population growth was stimulated. The federal government established the Wyoming Territory on July 25, 1868. Lacking significant deposits of gold and silver, unlike mineral-rich Colorado, Wyoming did not have such a population boom. But South Pass City had a short-lived boom after the Carissa Mine began producing gold in 1867. Copper was mined in some areas between the Sierra Madre Mountains and the Snowy Range near Grand Encampment.

Once government-sponsored expeditions to the Yellowstone country began, Colter's and Bridger's descriptions of the region's landscape were confirmed. In 1872, Yellowstone National Park was created as the world's first, to protect this area. Nearly all of the park lies within the northwestern corner of Wyoming.

On December 10, 1869, territorial Governor John Allen Campbell extended the right to vote to women, making Wyoming the first territory to do so. It kept that franchise when it established its state constitution. Women first served on juries in Wyoming (Laramie in 1870).

Wyoming was also a pioneer in welcoming women into electoral politics. It had the first female court bailiff (Mary Atkinson, Laramie, in 1870), and the first female justice of the peace in the country (Esther Hobart Morris, South Pass City, in 1870). In 1924, Wyoming was the first state to elect a female governor, Nellie Tayloe Ross, who took office in January 1925. Due to its civil-rights history, one of Wyoming's state nicknames is "The Equality State", and the official state motto is "Equal Rights".

Wyoming's constitution included women's suffrage and a pioneering article on water rights. Congress admitted Wyoming into the Union as the 44th state on July 10, 1890.

Wyoming was the location of the Johnson County War of 1892, which erupted between competing groups of cattle ranchers. The passage of the Homestead Act led to an influx of small ranchers. A range war broke out when either or both of the groups chose violent conflict over commercial competition in the use of the public land.

Geography

Climate

Wyoming's climate is generally semi-arid and continental (Köppen climate classification BSk) and is drier and windier in comparison to most of the United States with greater temperature extremes. Much of this is due to the topography of the state. Summer nights throughout the state are characterized by a rapid cooldown with even the hottest locations averaging in the  range at night. In most of the state, most of the precipitation tends to fall in the late spring and early summer. Winters are cold, but are variable with periods of sometimes extreme cold interspersed between generally mild periods, with Chinook winds providing unusually warm temperatures in some locations.

Precipitation depends on elevation with lower areas in the Big Horn Basin averaging , making the area nearly a true desert. Some mountain areas do receive a good amount of precipitation,  or more, much of it as snow, sometimes  or more annually.

The number of thunderstorm days varies across the state with the southeastern plains of the state having the most days of thunderstorm activity. Thunderstorm activity in the state is highest during the late spring and early summer. The southeastern corner of the state is the most vulnerable part of the state to tornado activity. Moving away from that point and westwards, the incidence of tornadoes drops dramatically with the west part of the state showing little vulnerability. Tornadoes, where they occur, tend to be small and brief, unlike some of those that occur farther east.

Location and size

As specified in the designating legislation for the Territory of Wyoming, Wyoming's borders are lines of latitude 41°N and 45°N, and longitude 104°3'W and 111°3'W (27 and 34 west of the Washington Meridian)—a geodesic quadrangle. Wyoming is one of only three states (the others being Colorado and Utah) to have borders defined by only "straight" lines. Due to surveying inaccuracies during the 19th century, Wyoming's legal border deviates from the true latitude and longitude lines by up to half of a mile (0.8 km) in some spots, especially in the mountainous region along the 45th parallel. Wyoming is bordered on the north by Montana, on the east by South Dakota and Nebraska, on the south by Colorado, on the southwest by Utah, and on the west by Idaho. It is the tenth largest state in the United States in total area, containing  and is made up of 23 counties.

Natural landforms

Mountain ranges

The Great Plains meet the Rocky Mountains in Wyoming. The state is a great plateau broken by many mountain ranges. In the northwest are the Absaroka, Owl Creek, Gros Ventre, Wind River, and the Teton ranges. In the north central are the Big Horn Mountains; in the northeast, the Black Hills; and in the southern region the Laramie, Snowy, and Sierra Madre ranges.

The Snowy Range in the south central part of the state is an extension of the Colorado Rockies both in geology and in appearance. The Bighorn Mountains in the north central portion are somewhat isolated from the bulk of the Rocky Mountains.

The park includes the Grand Teton, the second-highest peak in the state.

The Continental Divide spans north–south across the central portion of the state. Rivers east of the divide drain into the Missouri River Basin and eventually the Gulf of Mexico. They are the North Platte, Wind, Bighorn, and Yellowstone rivers. The Snake River in northwest Wyoming eventually drains into the Columbia River and the Pacific Ocean, as does the Green River through the Colorado River Basin.

The Continental Divide forks in the south central part of the state in an area known as the Great Divide Basin where water that precipitates onto or flows into it cannot reach an ocean—it all sinks into the soil and eventually evaporates.

Several rivers begin in or flow through the state, including the Yellowstone River, Bighorn River, Green River, and the Snake River.

Basins
Much of Wyoming is covered with large basins containing different eco-regions, from shrublands to smaller patches of desert. Regions of the state classified as basins contain everything from large geologic formations to sand dunes and vast unpopulated spaces. Basin landscapes are typically at lower elevations and include rolling hills, valleys, mesas, terraces and other rugged terrain, but also include natural springs as well as rivers and artificial reservoirs. They have common plant species such as various subspecies of sagebrush, juniper and grasses such as wheatgrass, but basins are known for their diversity of plant and animal species.

Islands

Wyoming has 32 named islands; the majority are in Jackson Lake and Yellowstone Lake, within Yellowstone National Park in the northwest portion of the state. The Green River in the southwest also contains a number of islands.

Regions and administrative divisions

Counties

The state of Wyoming has 23 counties.

Wyoming license plates have a number on the left that indicates the county where the vehicle is registered, ranked by an earlier census. Specifically, the numbers are representative of the property values of the counties in 1930. The county license plate numbers are:

Cities and towns

The State of Wyoming has 99 incorporated municipalities.

In 2005, 50.6% of Wyomingites lived in one of the 13 most populous Wyoming municipalities.

Metropolitan areas

The United States Census Bureau has defined two metropolitan statistical areas (MSA) and seven micropolitan statistical areas (MiSA) for the state. In 2008, 30.4% of Wyomingites lived in either of the metropolitan statistical areas, and 73% lived in either a metropolitan or a micropolitan area.

Demographics

Population

The United States Census Bureau estimated the population of Wyoming was 578,759 in 2019; in 2020, it had a 2020 census population of 576,851. The center of population of Wyoming is in Natrona County.

According to HUD's 2022 Annual Homeless Assessment Report, there were an estimated 648 homeless people in Wyoming. 

In 2014, the United States Census Bureau estimated the population's racial composition was 92.7% white (82.9% non-Hispanic white), 2.7% American Indian and Alaska Native, 1.6% Black or African American, 1.0% Asian American, and 0.1% Native Hawaiian or Pacific Islander. As of 2011, 24.9% of Wyoming's population younger than age1 were minorities. According to data from the American Community Survey, as of 2018, Wyoming was the only U.S. state where African Americans earn a higher median income than white workers.

According to the 2010 census, the racial composition of the population was 90.7% white, 0.8% black or African American, 2.4% American Indian and Alaska Native, 0.8% Asian American, 0.1% Native Hawaiian and other Pacific Islander, 2.2% from two or more races, and 3.0% from some other race. Ethnically, 8.9% of the total population was of Hispanic or Latino origin (they may be of any race) and 91.1% Non-Hispanic, with non-Hispanic whites constituting the largest non-Hispanic group at 85.9%.

As of 2015, Wyoming had an estimated population of 586,107, which was an increase of 1,954, or 0.29%, from the prior year and an increase of 22,481, or 3.99%, since the 2010 census. This includes a natural increase since the last census of 12,165 (33,704 births minus 21,539 deaths) and an increase from net migration of 4,035 into the state. Immigration resulted in a net increase of 2,264 and migration within the country produced a net increase of 1,771. In 2004, the foreign-born population was 11,000 (2.2%). In 2005, total births in Wyoming were 7,231 (birth rate of 14.04 per thousand). Sparsely populated, Wyoming is the least populous state of the United States. Wyoming has the second-lowest population density in the country (behind Alaska) and is the sparsest-populated of the 48 contiguous states. It is one of only two states (Vermont) with a population smaller than that of the nation's capital.

According to the 2000 census, the largest ancestry groups in Wyoming were: German (26.0%), English (16.0%), Irish (13.3%), Norwegian (4.3%), and Swedish (3.5%).

Birth data

Note: Births in table don't add up, because Hispanics are counted both by their ethnicity and by their race, giving a higher overall number.

 Since 2016, data for births of White Hispanic origin are not collected, but included in one Hispanic group; persons of Hispanic origin may be of any race.

Languages 
In 2010, 93.39% (474,343) of Wyomingites over age 5 spoke English as their primary language; 4.47% (22,722) spoke Spanish, 0.35% (1,771) spoke German, and 0.28% (1,434) spoke French. Other common non-English languages included Algonquian (0.18%), Russian (0.10%), Tagalog, and Greek (both 0.09%).

In 2007, the American Community Survey reported 6.2% (30,419) of Wyoming's population over five spoke a language other than English at home. Of those, 68.1% were able to speak English very well, 16.0% spoke English well, 10.9% did not speak English well, and 5.0% did not speak English at all.

Religion

In 2020, the Public Religion Research Institute determined that about 55% of Wyoming's adult population was Christian, primarily evangelical and mainline Protestant, Roman Catholic, and Mormon. The Public Religion Research Institute survey documented a decrease in religiosity from a 2014 separate Pew Research Center study; according to the Public Religion Research Institute, the irreligious made up 40% of the state population by 2020. According to a 2013 Gallup poll, Wyomingites' religious affiliations were 49% Protestant, 23% nonreligious or other, 18% Catholic, 9% Latter-day Saint (Mormons), and less than 1% Jewish.

A 2010 ARDA report recognized as Wyoming's largest denominations the Church of Jesus Christ of Latter-day Saints (Mormons), with 62,804 (11%); the Catholic Church, with 61,222 (10.8%); and the Southern Baptist Convention, with 15,812 (2.8%). The report counted 59,247 evangelical Protestants (10.5%), 36,539 mainline Protestants (6.5%), 785 Eastern Orthodox Christians; 281 Black Protestants; 65,000 adhering to other traditions; and 340,552 claiming no religious tradition. In 2020, ARDA reported the state's largest individual denominations as the following: the Catholic Church (69,500); the Church of Jesus Christ of Latter-day Saints (67,729); and the Southern Baptist Convention (11,082). Non-denominational Protestants were 23,410 in number.

Economy and infrastructure

According to a 2012 United States Bureau of Economic Analysis report, Wyoming's gross state product was $38.4 billion. As of 2014, the population was growing slightly with the most growth in tourist-oriented areas, such as Teton County. Boom conditions in neighboring states, such as North Dakota, were drawing energy workers away. About half of Wyoming's counties showed population loss. The state makes active efforts through Wyoming Grown, an internet-based recruitment program, to find jobs for young people educated in Wyoming who have emigrated but may wish to return.

The mineral-extraction industry and travel and tourism sector are the main drivers of Wyoming's economy. The federal government owns about 50% of its landmass, while the state controls 6%. The total taxable value of mining production in Wyoming in 2001 was over $6.7 billion. The tourism industry accounts for over $2 billion in revenue.

In 2002, more than six million people visited Wyoming's national parks and monuments. Wyoming's main tourist attractions include Grand Teton National Park, Yellowstone National Park, Devils Tower National Monument, Independence Rock and Fossil Butte National Monument. Yellowstone, the world's first national park, receives three million visitors each year.

Historically, agriculture has been an important component of Wyoming's economy. Its overall importance to the economy has waned, but it is still an essential part of Wyoming's culture and lifestyle. The main agricultural commodities Wyoming produces include livestock (beef), hay, sugar beets, grain (wheat and barley), and wool. More than 91% of Wyoming's land is classified as rural.

Wyoming is the home of only a handful of companies with a regional or national presence. Taco John's and Sierra Trading Post, both in Cheyenne, are privately held. Cloud Peak Energy in Gillette and U.S. Energy Corp. (NASDAQ: USEG) in Riverton are Wyoming's only publicly traded companies.

Mineral and energy production

Wyoming's mineral commodities include coal, natural gas, coalbed methane, crude oil, uranium, and trona.
 Wyoming produced 277 million short tons (251.29 million metric tons) of coal in 2019, a 9% drop from 2018. Wyoming's coal production peaked in 2008, when 514 million short tons (466.3 million metric tons) were produced. Wyoming has a reserve of 68.7 billion tons (62.3 billion metric tons) of coal. Major coal areas include the Powder River Basin and the Green River Basin.
 The boom for coalbed methane (CBM) began in the mid-1990s. CBM is methane gas extracted from Wyoming's coal bed seams. It is a means of natural gas production. There has been substantial CBM production in the Powder River Basin. In 2002, the CBM production yield was 327.5 billion cubic feet (9.3 km3).
 Wyoming produced  of crude oil in 2007. The state ranked fifth nationwide in oil production in 2007. Petroleum is most often used as a motor fuel, but is also used in the manufacture of plastics, paints, and synthetic rubber.
The Wyoming craton, which hosts the kimberlite volcanic pipes that were mined, underlies most of Wyoming.
 Wyoming produced 1.77 trillion cubic feet (50.0 billion m3) of natural gas in 2016, ranking the state ranked 6th nationwide in natural gas production. Major markets for natural gas include industrial, commercial, and domestic heating.
 Wyoming possesses the world's largest known reserve of trona, a mineral used in manufacturing glass, paper, soaps, baking soda, water softeners, and pharmaceuticals. In 2008, Wyoming produced 46 million short tons (41.7 million metric tons) of trona, 25% of the world's production.
 Because of its geography and altitude, the potential for wind power in Wyoming is one of the highest of any U.S. state. The Chokecherry and Sierra Madre Wind Energy Project is the largest commercial wind generation facility under development in North America. Carbon County is home to the largest proposed wind farm in the nation. Construction plans have been halted because of proposed new taxes on wind power energy production.
 Although uranium mining in Wyoming is much less active than in previous decades, recent increases in uranium's price have generated new interest in prospecting and mining.

Taxes

Unlike most other states, Wyoming levies no individual or corporate income tax. It also assesses no tax on retirement income earned and received from another state. Wyoming has a state sales tax of 4%. Counties have the option to collect an additional 1% tax for general revenue and a 1% tax for specific purposes, if approved by voters. Food for human consumption is not subject to sales tax. A county lodging tax varies from 2% to 5%. The state collects a use tax of 5% on items purchased elsewhere and brought into Wyoming. All property tax is based on the property's assessed value; Wyoming's Department of Revenue's Ad Valorem Tax Division supports, trains, and guides local government agencies in the uniform assessment, valuation and taxation of locally assessed property. "Assessed value" means taxable value; "taxable value" means a percentage of the fair market value of property in a particular class. Statutes limit property tax increases. For county revenue, the property tax rate cannot exceed 12 mills (or 1.2%) of assessed value. For cities and towns, the rate is limited to eight mills (0.8%). With very few exceptions, state law limits the property tax rate for all governmental purposes.

Personal property held for personal use is tax-exempt. Inventory held for resale, pollution control equipment, cash, accounts receivable, stocks and bonds are also exempt. Other exemptions include property used for religious, educational, charitable, fraternal, benevolent and government purposes and improvements for handicapped access. Mine lands, underground mining equipment, and oil and gas extraction equipment are exempt from property tax, but companies must pay a gross products tax on minerals and a severance tax on mineral production.

Wyoming does not collect inheritance taxes. There is limited estate tax related to federal estate tax collection.

In 2008, the Tax Foundation reported that Wyoming had the most "business-friendly" tax climate of any U.S. state. Wyoming state and local governments in fiscal year 2007 collected $2.242 billion in taxes, levies, and royalties from the oil and gas industry. The state's mineral industry, including oil, gas, trona, and coal, provided $1.3 billion in property taxes from 2006 mineral production. As of 2017, Wyoming receives more federal tax dollars as a percentage of state general revenue than any state except Montana.

As of 2016, Wyoming does not require the beneficial owners of LLCs to be disclosed in the filing, which creates an opportunity for a tax haven, according to Clark Stith of Clark Stith & Associates.

Transportation

Wyoming's largest airport is Jackson Hole Airport, with more than 500 employees. Three interstate highways and 13 U.S. highways pass through Wyoming. The Wyoming state highway system also serves the state.

Interstate 25 enters Wyoming south of Cheyenne and runs north, intersecting Interstate 80 immediately west of Cheyenne. It passes through Casper and ends at Interstate 90, near Buffalo. Interstate 80 crosses the Utah border west of Evanston and runs east through the southern third of the state, passing through Cheyenne before entering Nebraska near Pine Bluffs. Interstate 90 comes into Wyoming near Parkman and cuts through the northeastern part of the state. It serves Gillette and enters South Dakota east of Sundance.

U.S. Routes 14, 16, and the eastern section of U.S. 20 have their western terminus at the eastern entrance to Yellowstone National Park and pass through Cody. U.S. 14 runs eastward before joining I-90 at Gillette. U.S. 14 then follows I-90 to the South Dakota border. U.S. 16 and 20 split off of U.S. 14 at Greybull and U.S. 16 turns east at Worland while U.S. 20 continues south Shoshoni. U.S. Route 287 runs from Fort Collins, Colorado, to Laramie, Wyoming, through a pass between the Laramie Mountains and the Medicine Bow Mountains, then merges with US 30 and I-80 until it reaches Rawlins, where it continues north, passing Lander. Outside of Moran, U.S. 287 is part of a large interchange with U.S. Highways 26, 191, and 89, before continuing north to Yellowstone's southern entrance. U.S. 287 continues north of Yellowstone, but the park separates the two sections.

Other U.S. highways that pass through Wyoming are 18, 26, 30, 85, 87, 89, 189, 191, 212, and 287.

Wyoming is one of only two states (the other is South Dakota) in the 48 contiguous states not served by Amtrak. It was once served by Amtrak's San Francisco Zephyr and Pioneer lines. While no passenger trains roll through Wyoming today, intercity buses continue to connect residents across the state. Intercity bus carriers in the state include Express Arrow, Greyhound Lines, and Jefferson Lines.

Major interstates

  (300.5 mi) connects Denver, Cheyenne, Casper and Buffalo. Most of the highway is connected with US 87. Major junctions include Interstate 80, US 30, US 85, US 26, US Routes 18 & 20 and US 16 before its northern terminus at Interstate 90 in Buffalo.
  (402.8 mi) connects Evanston, Rock Springs, Rawlins, Laramie and Cheyenne. Major junctions include US 191, US 287, I-25, and US 85 & I-180.
  (208.8 mi) connects Sheridan, Buffalo and Gillette. Primarily in northeastern Wyoming. Major junctions include US 14, I-25 and US 16.

Wind River Indian Reservation

The Eastern Shoshone and Northern Arapaho tribes share the Wind River Indian Reservation in central western Wyoming, near Lander. The reservation is home to 2,500 Eastern Shoshone and 5,000 Northern Arapaho.

Chief Washakie established the reservation in 1868 as the result of negotiations with the federal government in the Fort Bridger Treaty, but the federal government forced the Northern Arapaho onto the Shoshone reservation in 1876 after it failed to provide a promised separate reservation.

Today the Wind River Indian Reservation is jointly owned, with each tribe having a 50% interest in the land, water, and other natural resources. It is a sovereign, self-governed land with two independent governing bodies: the Eastern Shoshone Tribe and the Northern Arapaho Tribe. Until 2014, the Shoshone Business Council and Northern Arapaho Business Council met jointly as the Joint Business Council to decide matters that affect both tribes. Six elected council members from each tribe served on the joint council.

Public lands

The federal government owns nearly half of Wyoming's land (about ); the state owns another . Most of it is administered by the Bureau of Land Management and U.S. Forest Service in numerous national forests and a national grassland, not to mention vast swaths of "public" land and an air force base near Cheyenne.

There are also areas managed by the National Park Service and agencies such as the U.S. Fish and Wildlife Service.
National parks
 Grand Teton National Park
 Yellowstone National Park—first designated national park in the world
Memorial parkway
 The John D. Rockefeller Jr. Memorial Parkway connects Yellowstone and Grand Teton.
National recreation areas
 Bighorn Canyon National Recreation Area
 Flaming Gorge National Recreation Area (managed by the Forest Service as part of Ashley National Forest)
National monuments
 Devils Tower National Monument—first national monument in the U.S.
 Fossil Butte National Monument
National historic trails, landmarks and sites
 California National Historic Trail
 Fort Laramie National Historic Site
 Independence Rock National Historic Landmark
 Medicine Wheel/Medicine Mountain National Historic Landmark
 Mormon Pioneer National Historic Trail
 National Register of Historic Places listings in Wyoming
 Oregon National Historic Trail
 Pony Express National Historic Trail
National fish hatcheries
 Jackson National Fish Hatchery
 Saratoga National Fish Hatchery
National wildlife refuges
 National Elk Refuge
 Seedskadee National Wildlife Refuge

Education

The state superintendent of public instruction, an elected state official, directs public education. The State Board of Education, a nine-member board appointed by the governor, sets educational policy. The constitution prohibits the state from establishing curriculum and textbook selections; these are the prerogative of local school boards. The Wyoming School for the Deaf was the only in-state school dedicated to supporting deaf students before it closed in the summer of 2000.

Higher education

Wyoming has a public four-year institution, the University of Wyoming in Laramie, and a private four-year college, Wyoming Catholic College, in Lander. There are also seven two-year community colleges.

Before the passing of a new law in 2006, Wyoming had hosted unaccredited institutions, many of them suspected diploma mills. The 2006 law requires unaccredited institutions to make one of three choices: move out of Wyoming, close down, or apply for accreditation. The Oregon State Office of Degree Authorization predicted in 2007 that in a few years the problem of diploma mills in Wyoming might be resolved.

Media

Wyoming's media market consists of 16 broadcast TV stations, radio stations and dozens of small to medium-sized newspapers. There are also a few small independent news sources such as the nonprofit news site Wyofile.com and Oil City News.

Government and politics

State government
Wyoming's Constitution established three branches of government: the executive, legislative, and judicial branches. The state legislature comprises a House of Representatives with 60 members and a Senate with 30 members. The executive branch is headed by the governor and includes a secretary of state, auditor, treasurer, and superintendent of public instruction. As Wyoming does not have a lieutenant governor, the secretary of state is first in the line of succession.

Wyoming's sparse population warrants the state only one at-large seat in the U.S. House of Representatives, and hence only three votes in the Electoral College.

The Wyoming State Liquor Association is the state's sole legal wholesale distributor of spirits, making it an alcoholic beverage control state. With the exception of wine, state law prohibits the purchase of alcoholic beverages for resale from any other source.

Judicial system

Wyoming's highest court is the Supreme Court of Wyoming, with five justices presiding over appeals from the state's lower courts. Wyoming is unusual in that it does not have an intermediate appellate court, like most states. This is largely attributable to the state's population and correspondingly lower caseload. Appeals from the state district courts go directly to the Wyoming Supreme Court. Wyoming also has state circuit courts (formerly county courts), of limited jurisdiction, which handle certain types of cases, such as civil claims with lower dollar amounts, misdemeanor criminal offenses, and felony arraignments. Circuit court judges also commonly hear small claims cases as well.

Before 1972, Wyoming judges were selected by popular vote on a nonpartisan ballot. This earlier system was criticized by the state bar who called for the adoption of the Missouri Plan, a system designed to balance judiciary independence with judiciary accountability. In 1972, an amendment to Article5 of the Wyoming Constitution, which incorporated a modified version of the plan, was adopted by the voters. Since the adoption of the amendment, all state court judges in Wyoming are nominated by the Judicial Nominating Commission and appointed by the Governor. They are then subject to a retention vote by the electorate one year after appointment.

Political history

Wyoming's political history defies easy classification. The state was the first to grant women the right to vote and to elect a woman governor. On December 10, 1869, John Allen Campbell, the first Governor of the Wyoming Territory, approved the first law in United States history explicitly granting women the right to vote. This day was later commemorated as Wyoming Day. On November 5, 1889, voters approved the first constitution in the world granting full voting rights to women.

While the state elected notable Democrats to federal office in the 1960s and 1970s, politics have become decidedly more conservative since the 1980s as the Republican Party came to dominate the state's congressional delegation. Today, Wyoming is represented in Washington by its two Senators, John Barrasso and Cynthia Lummis, and its one member of the House of Representatives, Congresswoman Harriet Hageman. All three are Republicans; a Democrat has not represented Wyoming in the Senate since 1977 or in the House since 1978. The state has not voted for a Democrat for president since 1964, one of only eight times since statehood. At present, there is only one relatively reliably Democratic county, affluent Teton, and one swing county, college county Albany. In the 2004 presidential election, George W. Bush won his second-largest victory, with 69% of the vote. Former Vice President Dick Cheney is a Wyoming resident and represented the state in Congress from 1979 to 1989.

Republicans are no less dominant at the state level. They have held a majority in the state senate continuously since 1936 and in the state house since 1964, though Democrats held the governorship for all but eight years between 1975 and 2011. Uniquely, Wyoming elected Democrat Nellie Tayloe Ross as the first woman in United States history to serve as state governor. She served from 1925 to 1927, winning a special election after her husband, William Bradford Ross, unexpectedly died a little more than a year into his term.

Culture

Sports

Due to its sparse population, Wyoming lacks any major professional sports teams; the Wyoming Mustangs, an indoor football team based in Gillette that began play in 2021, is the only professional team in the state. However, the Wyoming Cowboys and Cowgirls—particularly the football and basketball teams—are quite popular; their stadiums in Laramie are about 7,200 feet (2,200 m) above sea level, the highest in NCAA DivisionI. The Wyoming High School Activities Association also sponsors twelve sports and there are three junior ice hockey teams, all of which are members of the NA3HL. Casper has hosted the College National Finals Rodeo since 2001.

State symbols

List of all Wyoming state symbols:
 State bird: western meadowlark (Sturnella neglecta)
 State coin: Sacagawea dollar
 State dinosaur: Triceratops
 State emblem: Bucking Horse and Rider
 State fish: cutthroat trout (Oncorhynchus clarki)
 State flag: Flag of the State of Wyoming
 State flower: Wyoming Indian paintbrush (Castilleja linariifolia)
 State fossil: Knightia
 State gemstone: Wyoming nephrite jade
 State grass: western wheatgrass (Pascopyrum smithii)
 State insect: Sheridan's green hairstreak butterfly (Callophrys sheridanii)
 State mammal: American bison (Bison bison)
 State motto: Equal Rights
 State nicknames: Equality State; Cowboy State; Big Wyoming
 State reptile: horned lizard (Phrynosoma douglassi brevirostre)
 State seal: Great Seal of the State of Wyoming
 State song: "Wyoming" by Charles E. Winter & George E. Knapp
 State sport: rodeo
 State tree: plains cottonwood (Populus sargentii)

See also

Bibliography of Wyoming history
Index of Wyoming-related articles
Outline of Wyoming

Notes

References

External links

 State of Wyoming government official website
 Official Wyoming State Travel Website
 Wyoming State Facts from USDA
 
 

 
1890 establishments in the United States
States and territories established in 1890
States of the United States
Western United States
Contiguous United States